Havering Sixth Form College (alternatively styled Havering VI Form College), abbreviated as HSFC, is a sixth form college in Wingletye Lane, Hornchurch in the London Borough of Havering, East London, England. Built on the site of Dury Falls Secondary School, it opened in September 1991, and educates full-time students from the ages of 16 to 19. The college offers a wide range of subjects, in A-level, BTEC and diploma formats, amongst others. The current principal is Janet Smith.

Courses
The college offers many programmes of study for students of different abilities and talents. Qualifications offered include:
 AS level (Level 3)
 A level (Level 3)
 BTEC (Level 2, Level 3, Level 4 Art)
 GCSE (Level 2)
 ILEX (Level 2)
 Extended Project Qualification

The International Baccalaureate formally used to offered however, now that is no longer the case.

Buildings
The college is divided into nine main buildings, or blocks:
 Library Wing (ICT, computing, history, politics, health and social care)
 Science Wing (sciences)
 Theatre Wing (performing arts, music)
 Dury Falls Wing (business studies, economics, law)
 Newcourt (sociology, psychology, mathematics, law)
 Gatehouse (English, classical civilization, languages)
 Minster Court (art, graphics, photography, product design, media)
 Horsa Building (art, dance)
 International Building (geography, religious studies,  philosophy, archaeology)
 Berners-Lee House (ICT, computing)
 Olympia House (Travel and Tourism)

Facilities
Large athletics hall
Completely furbished gym, complete with all manner of exercise machines
Fully equipped theatre space, with lighting, sound and recording facilities
Numerous sound-proof recording studios
Comprehensive library, with internet capabilities

College Council
The views of the student body are voiced through the College Council, which is made up of at least one representative per tutor group, as well as members of subcommittees including the Executive, Catering, Environmental, Charity and Social committees. The full council meets every half term to get feedback from each committee and discuss/vote upon issues that the representatives bring from their tutor group members.

Notable alumni
 Michael Adebolajo Islamic terrorist convicted of the Murder of Lee Rigby
 Tim Aker, Politician and MEP
 Alex Day, Musician
 Eddie Hearn, Sports Promoter
 Mark Hunter, Olympic Gold Medalist
 Sally Oliver, Actress
 Sara Pascoe, Comedian

References

External links
Official website
Sixth Form College
Ardleigh Green Campus
Rainham Campus

Education in the London Borough of Havering
Sixth form colleges in London
Hornchurch
1991 establishments in England